P. Shanmugam a/l V. Pitchay is a Malaysian politician who has served as Member of the Malacca State Executive Council (EXCO) in the Barisan Nasional (BN) state administration under Chief Minister Sulaiman Md Ali since November 2021 and Member of the Malacca State Legislative Assembly (MLA) for Gadek since November 2021. He is a member of the Malaysian Indian Congress (MIC), a component party of the ruling Barisan Nasional (BN) coalition. He is also the sole Malacca EXCO member and MLA of Indian descent and from MIC. He is also the sole MIC candidate fielded  and subsequently gained victory in the 2021 Malacca state election.

Election results

References

People from Malacca
Malaysian people of Indian descent
Malaysian Indian Congress politicians
1969 births
Living people